New Look is a British global fashion retailer with a chain of high street shops. It was founded in 1969. The chain sells womenswear, menswear, and clothing for teens.

History

New Look was founded by Tom Singh in Taunton, Somerset, in 1969. Since then the company has expanded and previously operated across a chain of over 900 stores internationally, including Belgium (they opened their first Belgium store in 2006), France, the Netherlands, the Republic of Ireland, Romania, Malta, Malaysia, South Korea, Singapore, Thailand, Indonesia, United Arab Emirates, China, Germany, Russia, Bahrain, Saudi Arabia, Azerbaijan and Poland, and a staff of over 18,000. The group had a turnover of £1,147 million in 2008 with profits of £180 million.

New Look was owned by private equity groups Apax Partners and Permira, and founder Tom Singh, until May 2015 when it was acquired by Brait SA for £780 million. Brait also owns the health club chain Virgin Active and has a minority stake in Iceland Foods.

In 2004, after six years afloat, the company withdrew from the stock market and was taken back to being a privately owned business by founder Tom Singh and chief executive Phil Wrigley, and private equity investors Permira, Apax Partners and Quillian Investments.

On 26 April 2007, a fire occurred at a New Look branch in Oxford Street, London. The subsequent investigation revealed an extensive catalogue of failings relating to fire safety precautions and measures. The company subsequently pleaded guilty to criminal charges and on 25 November 2009, was fined a total of £400,000 with £136,052 costs. In 2010, the fines were upheld by the Court of Appeal.

In 2008, New Look continued their expansion in the UK and opened their largest store at the time in Liverpool One Shopping Centre. In February 2009, the company's fortieth anniversary year, New Look opened their first store in Russia.

In July 2010, New Look opened their three-hundredth store in Glasgow Fort Shopping Park. It was built on the site of a former Borders store.

The largest New Look store in the world opened in Dublin, Ireland on 4 November 2010, located at the Jervis Shopping Centre. It is the twenty-ninth New Look store in Ireland. Many of the outlets in Singapore have been closed, except CityLink Mall, City Square Mall and the latest opened store, Republic Polytechnic. In November 2018, New Look closed over 100 stores in the United Kingdom and withdrew from international markets.

Financial data
Numbers are in millions pounds.

See also
 Top Track 100 — list of 100 largest private companies in the United Kingdom, New look is at no 32.

References

External links

 New Look Website
 New Look General Website

News items
 New Look moves 250 jobs to London in January 2009
 New HQ in Weymouth in August 2007
 Newcastle-under-Lyme in July 2004
 Going private in February 2004

1969 establishments in England
British companies established in 1969
Clothing retailers of England
Companies based in Dorset
Clothing companies established in 1969
Retail companies established in 1969
Privately held companies of England
Apax Partners companies
Permira companies
Organisations based in Weymouth, Dorset
Companies formed by management buyout